The Manitoba Marathon weekend consists of a marathon, half marathon, marathon relay, 10 km race, and 2.6 mile fun run. The marathon was first run in the City of Winnipeg in 1979 and has generally been held annually on Father's Day since then.  In 2019, about 10,000 runners in total participated over the weekend, including 655 who finished the marathon.

The half marathon is also being held as the Canadian Half Marathon Championships from 2019 to 2022.

The 2020 in-person edition of the race was cancelled due to the coronavirus pandemic.

Marathon
The full marathon runs through residential and downtown streets.

Half marathon

Team relay

Other races
 10K Walk
 Super Run - a  run.
 Mini Mites Fun Run - open to kids 5 years and under.
 Wheelchair Full Marathon
 Wheelchair Half Marathon
 Wheelchair 10K

See also
 List of marathon races in North America
 Canadian Half Marathon Championships
 Athletics Canada
 Canadian records in track and field
 Sports in Canada

Notes

References

External links
 Manitoba Marathon information

Marathons in Canada
Sports competitions in Winnipeg
Recurring sporting events established in 1979
1979 establishments in Manitoba
Summer events in Canada